Old St. Mary's Church, also known as St. Mary's Church of Ireland Church, is  a medieval church in Clonmel, County Tipperary, Ireland. 

It is believed to have been built in 1204 by William de Burgh, and was referenced in a letter dated August 1228.
The entire over ground 13th Century structure has disappeared, but the remains of an armored knight were found in a vault from that period, under the south aisle, in 1832. The Church as it is known today took shape during the 14th, 15th and 16th Centuries.

The Church's main features are a 27 ft square, 84 ft high bell tower, the eastern tower house, and ornate 16th Century east and west windows. Major renovations were undertaken on the building in 1805.  The Tower had, at one time, a wooden spire and belfry, which has not been restored.
Crenellated parapets suggest that this was a fortified structure. Cromwell's attack on the town cost the Church its Tower House (today's vestry), the rest of the church was unscathed.

References

Buildings and structures in Clonmel
Fortified church buildings
Church of Ireland church buildings in the Republic of Ireland
Religious buildings and structures in County Tipperary